Michael Ensign (born February 13, 1944) is an American actor who mostly played very small roles. One of his most-known roles was Benjamin Guggenheim in the 1997 film Titanic.

Early life
Ensign was raised in both the United States and England. He trained at the London Academy of Music and Dramatic Art and spent the first ten years of his professional career working in the theatre in Britain.

Religion
Born into a family in the Church of Jesus Christ of Latter-day Saints, he later became a member of the Episcopal Church, attending a parish which is in the Anglo-Catholic tradition.

Career
He was a member of the Royal Shakespeare Company in the 1970s, appearing in productions of As You Like It, Love's Labour's Lost, and Cymbeline amongst others. He has appeared in Irene, Curse of the Starving Class, and The Red Devil Battery Sign in the West End.

Ensign's film credits include Superman (1978), Pink Floyd – The Wall (1982), WarGames (1983), Ghostbusters (1984), Dr. Hackenstein (1988), Titanic (1997), Solaris (2002), Bringing Down the House (2003), Down with Love (2003) and Seabiscuit (2003).

Ensign's many television appearances include Boston Legal, Three’s Company, Alias, Monk, JAG, CSI: Crime Scene Investigation, Star Trek: Enterprise, The X-Files, Friends, Star Trek: Voyager, Star Trek: Deep Space Nine, Star Trek: The Next Generation, MacGyver, Dynasty, Falcon Crest, M*A*S*H, The A-Team, and The Dukes Of Hazzard. He appeared in the TV miniseries The Winds of War and Dream West.

Ensign provided the voice of the villainous Doctor Nefarious Tropy in the video games Crash Bandicoot: Warped, Crash Team Racing, Crash Nitro Kart and Crash Twinsanity. His role of N. Tropy was later passed down to Corey Burton, who voiced the character in Crash Bandicoot: The Wrath of Cortex, Crash Bandicoot: N-Sane Trilogy, and Crash Team Racing Nitro-Fueled, and then passed to JP Karliak, who currently voices the latter in Crash Bandicoot 4: It's About Time. He gave his voice for Dr. Sebastian Wolfe in 2011 video game inFamous 2.

In 2009 Ensign was given the Distinguished Alumnus Award for Theatre from the College of Fine Arts at University of Utah in Salt Lake City.

Writing in Forbes in 2011, David M. Ewalt noted, "Ensign is a classic example of "Hey! It's that guy!" --a versatile character actor with a long and illustrious career, but who you probably can't identify by name, or even where you've seen him" before going on to list some of Ensign's key film appearances.

Filmography

Film

Television

Video games

References

External links 
 Michael Ensign at the British Film Institute
 
 Michael Ensign (Aveleyman)

1944 births
20th-century American male actors
21st-century American male actors
American male film actors
American male stage actors
American male television actors
American male video game actors
American male voice actors
American people of British descent
Living people
Royal Shakespeare Company members